Joseph "Josy" Kirchens (born 22 February 1943) is a Luxembourgian former footballer and manager. A forward, he played his entire club career for Aris Bonnevoie and was capped 16 times for the Luxembourg national football team. Kirchens managed Avenir Beggen for the 1976–1977 season and the Luxembourg national football team for four games in 1985.

International goals 

 Scores and results list Luxembourg's goal tally first, score column indicates score after each Kirchens goal.

Honours
Luxembourg National Division: 3
 1963–64, 1965–66, 1971–72

Luxembourg Cup: 1
 1966–67

References

1943 births
Living people
Luxembourgian footballers
Luxembourg international footballers
Luxembourgian football managers
FC Avenir Beggen managers
Luxembourg national football team managers
Association football forwards
FC Aris Bonnevoie players